"Mas que Nada" is a song written and originally recorded in 1963 by Jorge Ben (currently known as "Jorge Ben Jor") on his debut album Samba Esquema Novo, which was covered in 1966 by Sérgio Mendes, becoming one of the latter's signature songs. It was voted by the Brazilian edition of Rolling Stone as the fifth-greatest Brazilian song. It was inducted to the Latin Grammy Hall of Fame in 2013.

Title meaning 
Brazilians use Mas que nada (in a literal translation: just nothing)  colloquially to disagree with someone. A fitting English translation might be a sarcastic "Yeah, right!" or "No way!"

With many recordings, the title song is incorrectly written Mais que nada (Portuguese for "more than nothing") which would fundamentally alter its meaning, and would be the equivalent to the Spanish expression más que nada, which means "more than anything", or "above all", and is used in the sense of "mainly" or "principally".

José Prates song
In 1958, Brazilian artist José Prates recorded a track called "Nanã Imborô" that appears on his album Tam... Tam... Tam...! (1958, Polydor Brasil – LPNG 4.016), which features the underlying melody and vocalizations later used by Jorge Ben in "Mas que Nada" This motifs would by further highlighted by Sergio Mendes’ arrangement of the song in 1966.

Sérgio Mendes versions
Sérgio Mendes covered the song with his band Brasil '66 on their debut album, Herb Alpert Presents Sergio Mendes & Brasil '66 (1966). In the United States, the single reached number 47 on the US Billboard Hot 100, and number four on the Billboard Easy Listening chart. Outside of Brazil this 1966 version is better known than Jorge Ben's original and, to many, the definitive version of the song. In 1989, Mendes re-recorded the song on his album Arara.

With the Black Eyed Peas

In 2006, Mendes again re-recorded the song, this time with American musical group the Black Eyed Peas and additional vocals by Mendes' wife, Gracinha Leporace, for his album Timeless. This version contains a sample of the Black Eyed Peas' 2004 single "Hey Mama". The song topped the charts of Hungary and the Netherlands and peaked at number six on the UK Singles Chart. This version was included in the 2011 animated film Rio (along with another version recorded in the style of Brasil '66 and also coincidentally featured one of the members, will.i.am with a voice role in the film as Pedro the red-crested cardinal one of the main characters of the film) and its soundtrack.

Track listings
US 12-inch single
A1. "Mas que Nada" (The Masters at Work remix) – 8:03
B1. "Mas que Nada" (radio edit featuring the Black Eyed Peas) – 3:32
B2. "Mais que Nada" (original Sérgio Mendes & Brasil '66 version) – 2:41

European CD single
 "Mas que Nada" (radio edit featuring the Black Eyed Peas) – 3:32
 "Mais que Nada" (original Sérgio Mendes & Brasil '66 version) – 2:41

European 12-inch single
A1. "Mas que Nada" (Masters at Work remix) – 8:03
B1. "Mas que Nada" (Full Phat remix) – 4:27
B2. "Mas que Nada" (Masters at Work dub remix) – 5:20

German maxi-CD single
 "Mas que Nada" (radio edit featuring the Black Eyed Peas) – 3:32
 "Mas que Nada" (The Masters at Work remix) – 8:03
 "Mais que Nada" (original Sérgio Mendes & Brasil '66 version) – 2:41

Charts

{|class="wikitable sortable plainrowheaders" style="text-align:center"
|+Weekly chart performance for "Mas que Nada"
!Chart (2006–2007)
!Peakposition
|-

|-

|-

|-

|-

|-

|-
!scope="row"|Europe (Eurochart Hot 100)
|7
|-

|-

|-
!scope="row"|Greece (IFPI)<ref> See Best Position column.</ref>
|19
|-

|-

|-

|-

|-

|-

|-

|-

|-

|-

|-
!scope="row"|US Dance Music/Club Play Singles (Billboard)
|13
|}

Sales and certifications

Other versions
Outside Brazil, the song has been covered by dozens of international stars:

Hugh Masekela included the song in his 1966 live album The Americanization of Ooga Booga.
Dizzy Gillespie included a cover version on his albums The Melody Lingers On (1966) and Swing Low, Sweet Cadillac (1967).
Miriam Makeba covered the song on for her albums  Live from Paris & Conakry (1996) and Miriam Makeba in Concert! (1967).
A Moog version is featured on Perrey and Kingsley's album, Kaleidoscopic Vibrations: Electronic Pop Music From Way Out (1967).
Lill Lindfors recorded a Swedish-language version titled Hör min samba for her album Du är den ende (1967).
Warren Kime recorded a version, track number one, on his Brass Impact album RS 910 SD (LP) and R4T3-910 (Reel Tape) issued in 1967.
A rumba version is featured on the album Patato & Totico by Patato Valdes and Totico Arango (1968).
Klaus Wunderlich under the pseudonym Chris Waxman released a spirited version during this period, performed on the Hammond organ, for the opening track on a special phase four stereo album Organized (1968) (London and Decca SP 44119).
The Chopsticks, a Hong Kong female duo, covered this song on their first LP The Chopsticks: Sandra and Amina (1970).
Ella Fitzgerald recorded it on her 1971 album Things Ain't What They Used to Be (And You Better Believe It) with English lyrics by Loryn Deane.
The Sacramento Freelancers Drum and Bugle Corps performed this song as part of their 1976 show.
Al Jarreau also did a cover version on his 1994 album Tenderness.
UK garage singer Colour Girl recorded her version featuring MC PSG in 2001, which reached No. 57 on the UK Singles Chart and the top 10 of the UK Dance Singles Chart.
French jazz guitarist Marc Antoine performed an instrumental version on his album Cruisin (2001).
Serbian jazz and pop singer Madame Piano also covered it in 2001. and included it on her second studio album Zemlja čuda, while Croatian cellist Walter Despalj did an arrangement of the song for a group of cellos.
The Idea of North perform "Mas que Nada" a cappella, and have recorded a version on The Sum of Us (2001) featuring James Morrison on trombone.
Filipino bossa nova singer Sitti did a remake of this song, which is included on her 2006 album, Café Bossa.
The Los Angeles Guitar Quartet recorded a version for their 2007 album LAGQ Brazil.
 British singer Ava Leigh covered the song for her debut album, Rollin. It was released as a double A-side with "Mad About the Boy". This version has recently been used in UK television commercials for clothing chain Next (2008).
Jessy J recorded a cover of this song in her album Tequila Moon (2008).
Covered by Jane McDonald in her seventh album Jane in 2008.
The Slovenian XL vocal group Perpetuum Jazzile performed the song in a cappella arrange at Vokal Xtravaganzza (2008).
Madlib included this song in episode 2 of the Madlib Medicine Show on the track "Rio de Janeiro" in 2010.
 Palo Yuba Orquesta made a salsa cover in 2010.
 The Sergio Mendes version was used in the movies I Shot Andy Warhol in 1996, Austin Powers: International Man of Mystery in 1997, and Rio in 2011.
Pink Martini and Saori Yuki released the album 1969 in 2011. "Mas que Nada" is track number eight.
 French girl group Nossa released a cover of this song as a single in 2012.
Jazztronik has recorded a cover of this song, including the electric jazz and bossa nova instrumentation on the album Vamos la Brasil'' (2014).

References

1963 songs
1966 songs
2006 singles
A&M Records singles
Black Eyed Peas songs
Bossa nova songs
Brazilian songs
Dutch Top 40 number-one singles
Miriam Makeba songs
Number-one singles in Hungary
Portuguese-language songs
Samba songs
Sérgio Mendes songs
Latin Grammy Hall of Fame Award recipients